Lostine Pharmacy, also known as Lostine Tavern, is an historic building in Lostine, Oregon. It was constructed in 1900 and is listed on the National Register of Historic Places.

See also
 National Register of Historic Places listings in Wallowa County, Oregon

References

1900 establishments in Oregon
Commercial buildings completed in 1900
National Register of Historic Places in Wallowa County, Oregon